Admiral Makarov (Адмирал Макаров) is a Russian icebreaker operated by the Far East Shipping Company (FESCO). Completed in 1975, she is FESCO's oldest icebreaker. Admiral Makarov and her sister ship Krasin (1976), are the largest of the four icebreakers in FESCO's fleet. She is named after the Imperial Russian Navy Admiral Stepan Makarov and was one of two icebreakers involved in Operation Breakthrough, an international effort to free three gray whales from pack ice in the Beaufort Sea near Point Barrow in the U.S. state of Alaska in 1988.

The ship is chartered out for scientific expeditions and used as a supplier ship.

Layout
Triple-screw, four-decker, with forecastle, poop, elongated superstructure, fore deckhouse, middle engine room, diesel-electric icebreaker with icebreaker bow and cruiser stern.

Service
1988: Operation Breakthrough
2003-2006: in the Baltic Sea - escorting vessels to and from Primorsk;
2006 (10-year contract): in the Tatar Strait - with icebreaker Krasin, escorting large-capacity crude oil tankers to De-Kastri, in project Sakhalin-I.

See also
Icebreaker Krasin
Kapitan Khlebnikov
Icebreaker Magadan

References

Ships built in Helsinki
Icebreakers of the Soviet Union
Icebreakers of Russia
1975 ships